The Minister of State at the Department of Justice is a junior ministerial post in the Department of Justice of the Government of Ireland who performs duties and functions delegated by the Minister for Justice. A Minister of State does not hold cabinet rank.

The current Minister of State is James Browne, TD, who was appointed in September 2020.

List of Parliamentary Secretaries

List of Ministers of State

References

Justice
Department of Justice (Ireland)